The MC-1 bomb was the first U.S. non-clustered air-dropped chemical munition. The  MC-1 was first produced in 1959 and carried the nerve agent sarin.

History
The MC-1 chemical bomb was first brought into regular mass-production in 1959. A modified general purpose demolition bomb, the MC-1 was the first non-clustered chemical munition in the U.S. arsenal. The MC-1 was designed to be delivered via U.S. Air Force aircraft. The MC-1 was never used against enemy targets.

Specifications
The MC-1 was a  munition. The MC-1 was designed to be air-dropped via the F-4 Phantom II and was unable to fit that aircraft's replacement, the F-16.

Demilitarization operations
Umatilla Chemical Depot stored about 2,400 MC-1 bombs until the final one was demilitarized and destroyed on June 9, 2006. Another 3,047 MC-1s were stored at Johnston Atoll when demilitarization operations began there in 1990. Those weapons were destroyed during the ensuing decade and operations at Johnston Atoll Chemical Agent Disposal System ended in 2000.

Test involving the MC-1
Tests were conducted using the MC-1 from July-November 1971 at Dugway Proving Ground in Utah. The aim of these tests, which were part of Project 112, was twofold. One goal was to determine hazards associated with the accidental release or damage from hostile fire of the MC-1 during takeoff or landing. A second goal was to determine if leak suppressant and disposal procedures for damaged bombs were adequate. For the purpose of the tests the MC-1 was filled with water and a sarin simulant, di(2-ethylhexyl) phthalate (DEHP). The bombs were dropped from an F-4 during the tests.

See also
M117 bomb

References

Chemical weapon delivery systems
Cold War aerial bombs of the United States
Chemical weapons of the United States
Military equipment introduced in the 1950s